Wieczfnia Kościelna  is a village in Mława County, Masovian Voivodeship, in east-central Poland. It is the seat of the gmina (administrative district) called Gmina Wieczfnia Kościelna.

References

Villages in Mława County
Płock Governorate
Warsaw Voivodeship (1919–1939)